Killien Jungen (born 16 March 1995) is a Dutch footballer who plays as a attacker for AS Cannes.

Career

At the age of 17, Jungen joined the youth academy of Dutch side Vitesse and trialed with the youth academy of Ajax, the most successful club in the Netherlands, after playing for the youth academy of French Ligue 1 team Monaco.

In 2014, he signed for Erzgebirge Aue in Germany after trialing for Hungarian outfit MTK and Antwerp in the Belgian second division.

Before the second half of 2015/16, Jungen signed for Dutch side TOP Oss, where he made 1 league appearance and scored 0 goals and suffered a cruciate ligament injury. On 29 January 2016, he debuted for TOP Oss during a 2-3 loss to FC Dordrecht.

In 2018, Jungen signed for RC Grasse in the French fourth division.

In 2020, he signed for French fifth division club Cannes.

International career

Jungen is eligible to represent France, having moved there at the age of 1.

Career statistics

References

External links
 
 

Dutch footballers
Living people
1995 births
Championnat National 2 players
Championnat National 3 players
Eerste Divisie players
TOP Oss players
RC Grasse players
AS Cannes players
People from Purmerend
French people of Dutch descent
Association football forwards
Expatriate footballers in Germany
French expatriate sportspeople in Germany
Dutch expatriate sportspeople in Germany
SBV Vitesse players
AS Monaco FC players
FC Erzgebirge Aue players
Footballers from North Holland
Sportspeople from Cannes
Footballers from Provence-Alpes-Côte d'Azur